Rock en Seine is a three-day rock music festival, held at Domaine National de Saint-Cloud, the Château de Saint-Cloud's park, west of Paris, inside the garden designed by André Le Nôtre.

Name 
The name is a pun, based on exactly the same pronunciation in French of the words scène meaning 'stage' and Seine (the river separating Saint-Cloud from Central Paris after which the Hauts-de-Seine département is called).

History 
 2003: Birth of Rock en Seine on 27 August, with two stages and ten bands. 
 2004: The festival extends over two days. It welcomes new artistic forms with Rockfolio, Rock en Strophes and Rock en Clips. 
 2005: The festival site gets bigger: the third stage appears, as well as a campsite. 
 2007: The festival extends over three days. 
 2010: 105 000 people attending to this edition. 
 2011: The fourth stage is emerging. 
 2014: 120 000 people attending to this edition. The new stage named "Ile-de-France" hosts the Avant-Seine's bands. 
 2017: Sarah Schmitt becomes the new director of the festival. The festival welcomes a "Firestone" stage.

COVID-19 pandemic: 2020 and 2021 editions 
On 12 May 2020, it was announced that the 2020 edition of the festival would be cancelled because of the ongoing COVID-19 pandemic. The 2021 edition was also cancelled due to the same reason.

Previous years 
 2003: 1st year, 2 stages, 10 artists, 22,000 spectators 
 2004: 2nd year, extended to Two days, 22 artists, 48,000 spectators
 2005: 3rd year, Three stages, 30 artists, 46,000 spectators
 2006: 4th year, Three stages, 30 artists, 57,000 spectators
 2007: 5th year, extended to Three days, 45 artists, 68,000 spectators
 2008: Three stages, 34 artists, 76,000 spectators
 2009: Three stages, 47 artists, 97,000 spectators
 2010: Three stages, 47 artists, 105,000 spectators
 2011: Four stages, 63 bands, 105,000 spectators
 2012: Four stages, 62 artists, 108,000 spectators
 2013: Four stages, 56 artists, 110,000 spectators
 2014: Five stages, 65 artists, 120,000 spectators
 2015: Five stages, 66 artists, 110,000 spectators
 2016: Five stages, 65 artists, 110,000 spectators
 2017: Six stages, 78 artists, 110,000 spectators
 2018: Six stages, 78 artists, 90,000 spectators (to confirm)
 2019: Five stages, 62 artists, 100,000 spectators
 2022: Five stages, 58 artists, 150,000 spectators

The venue 
The festival takes place in the down of the Park of "Domaine national de Saint-Cloud", a historical place at the gates of Paris, and five minutes from the nearest subway station, métro Boulogne - Pont de Saint-Cloud.

The park and the garden were designed by Le Nôtre in the 17th century, and it is the first park to be classed as a Monument historique in 1994. It is a 4.6 km2 park, and there are gardens and forest with basins, thickets, cascades, and statues.

Avant-Seine 
In 2005, for its third edition, and with the support of Ile-de-France, Rock en Seine inaugurated "Avant-Seine", a selection of bands from Ile-de-France which join the official programming of the festival. Every year, six selected groups are playing on a stage, and one of their tracks is published on a compilation spread for free.

 2005: Stuck in the Sound, Flying Pooh, HushPuppies, Herman Düne, Sayag Jazz Machine, Hopper.
 2006: Rhesus, Dead Pop Club, Daddy Longlegs, Neïmo, French Paradoxe, Fancy.
 2007: Housse de Racket, Hey Hey My My, Nelson, Pravda, Rodeo Massacre, I Love UFO.
 2008: Narrow Terence, Brooklyn, The Latitudz, Molecule, Da Brasilians, Fortune. 
 2009: Lilly Wood & The Prick, Hindi Zahra, Cheveu, Gush, Jil Is Lucky, The Tatianas.  
 2010: Success, King of Conspiracy, I Am Un Chien, Quadricolor, Viva & the Diva, Roken is Dodelijk. 
 2011: Frànçois and The Atlas Mountains, Concrete Knives, The Feeling of Love, Myra Lee, Beat Mark, Birdy Hunt. 
 2012: Granville, Owlle, Yeti Lane, The Lanskies, Versus, Hyphen Hyphen. 
 2013: FAUVE, Team Ghost, FI/SHE/S, J.C. Satàn, St. Lô, Wall Of Death. 
 2014: ALB, Dorian Pimpernel, Feu! Chatterton, Jessica93, PEGASE, Petit fantôme. 
 2015: DBFC, VKNG, Forever Pavot, We Are Match, Jeanne Added, Last Train.
 2016: KillASon, O, Adrien Soleiman, Kaviar Special, Maestro, Théo Lawrence & The Hearts. 
 2017: Inuït, Barbagallo, Gracy Hopkins, Lysistrata, Therapie Taxi, Rendez-Vous. 
 2018: 8 In Bloom, La Veine, Lily, Yanse, The Cage, Moons

Musical Acts

Edition 2003

Edition 2004 

 Replaced Black Rebel Motorcycle Club

Edition 2005

Edition 2006 

 Replaced Richard Ashcroft

Edition 2007 

 Replaced Amy Winehouse
 Replaced The Horrors

Edition 2008 

Were meant to play on the Scene de l'Industrie but were added to the Grande Scene when Amy Winehouse cancelled at the last minute for unknown reasons. She never arrived to the festival site, despite her support musicians being there.

Edition 2009 

Madness, who played earlier, replaced headliners Oasis, after a fight between the Gallagher brothers backstage leading to the band's disbandment.
 Replaced Esser

Edition 2010

Edition 2011 

 Replaced Young the Giant
 Replaced Q Tip

Edition 2012

Edition 2013

Edition 2014

Edition 2015

Edition 2016

Edition 2017

Edition 2018

Edition 2019

References

http://www.rockenseine.com/timeline/

External links
 Official website  
 Official blog  

Rock festivals in France
Hauts-de-Seine
Tourist attractions in Île-de-France
Tourist attractions in Hauts-de-Seine
Music festivals established in 2003